Listed are major episodes of civil unrest in the United States. This list does not include the numerous incidents of destruction and violence associated with various sporting events.

18th century
1783 – Pennsylvania Mutiny of 1783, June 20. Anti-government protest by soldiers of the Continental Army against the Congress of the Confederation, Philadelphia, Pennsylvania
 1786 – Shays' Rebellion, August 29, 1786 – February 3, 1787, Western Massachusetts
 1786 – Paper Money Riot, September 20, Exeter, New Hampshire
 1788 – Doctors Mob Riot, New York City
 1791–1794 – Whiskey Rebellion, Western Pennsylvania (anti-excise tax on whiskey)
 1799 – Fries's Rebellion, 1799–1800, Tax revolt by Pennsylvania Dutch farmers, Pennsylvania

19th century

1800–1849
 1811 - 1811 German Coast uprising, slave revolt in the Territory of Orleans
 1812 – Baltimore riots, these took place shortly before the War of 1812
 1824 – Hard Scrabble and Snow Town Riots, 1824 & 1831 respectively, Providence, RI (race riots)
 1829 – Cincinnati riots of 1829, August 15–22, Cincinnati, Ohio; race riots triggered by labor competition between Irish immigrants and southern black migrants
 1831 – Nat Turner's slave rebellion, August 21–23, Southampton County, Virginia
 1834 – Anti-abolitionist riot, New York City
 1834 – Philadelphia race riot, August 12– 14
 1834 – Attack on Canterbury Female Boarding School, Canterbury, Connecticut, one of the first schools for African American girls
 1835 – Baltimore bank riot, August 6–9
 1835 – Gentleman's Riot, numerous riots throughout 1835 targeting abolitionists, Boston, Massachusetts
 1835 – Snow Riot, Washington D.C.; race riot caused by labor competition
 1835 – Destruction of Noyes Academy, Canaan, New Hampshire, a racially integrated school
 1835–1836 – Toledo War, a boundary dispute between states of Michigan and Ohio
 1836 – Cincinnati Riots of 1836, Cincinnati, Ohio (race riots)
 1837 – Flour Riots, New York City
 1837 – Murder of abolitionist Elijah Lovejoy
 1838 – Burning of Pennsylvania Hall; a lecture hall built with the intention of debating abolition, women's rights, and other reforms is burned down only 4 days after opening.
 1839 – Honey War, Iowa-Missouri border
 1839 – Anti-Rent War, Hudson Valley, New York
 1841 – Dorr Rebellion, Rhode Island
 1841 – Cincinnati Riots of 1841, early September, Cincinnati, Ohio (race riot)
 1842 – Lombard Street Riot, (a.k.a. the Abolition Riots), August 1, Philadelphia
 1842 – Muncy Abolition riot of 1842
 1844 – Philadelphia Nativist Riots, May 6–8, July 6–7, Philadelphia (anti-Catholic)
 1845 – Milwaukee Bridge War
 1849 – Astor Place riot, May 10, New York City, (anti-British)

1850–1859
 1851 – Christiana Riot, Lancaster County, Pennsylvania
 1853 – Cincinnati Riot of 1853, Cincinnati, Ohio (anti-Catholic)
 1855 – Cincinnati riots of 1855 (anti-immigration)
 1855 – Lager Beer Riot, April 21, Chicago, Illinois
 1855 – Portland Rum Riot, June 2, Portland, Maine
 1855 – Bloody Monday, Know-Nothing Party riot, August 6, Louisville, Kentucky (anti-immigration)
 1855 – Detroit brothel riots, 1855–1859, Detroit, Michigan
 1856 – Sacking of Lawrence, Kansas, May 21, 1856, when proslavery settlers, led by Douglas County Sheriff Samuel J. Jones, attacked and ransacked Lawrence, Kansas, founded by antislavery settlers from Massachusetts hoping to make Kansas a free state. The incident fueled the irregular conflict in Kansas Territory that later became known as Bleeding Kansas.
 1856 – Battle of Seattle (1856), Jan 26, Attack by Native American tribesmen upon Seattle, Washington.
 1856 – Pottawatomie massacre, May 24, Franklin County, Kansas
 1856 – Know-Nothing Riot of 1856, Baltimore, Maryland (anti-immigration)
 1856 – San Francisco Vigilance Movement, San Francisco, California
 1857 – Know-Nothing Riot, June 1, Washington D.C. (anti-immigration)
 1857 – New York City Police Riot, June 16, New York City
 1857 – Dead Rabbits Riot, July 4–5, New York City
 1858 – Know-Nothing Riot 1858, New Orleans, Louisiana (anti-immigration)
 1859 – John Brown's raid on Harpers Ferry, October 16, Harpers Ferry, Virginia

1860–1869
 1861–1865: American Civil War, April 12 – 9, United States
1861 – Baltimore Riot of 1861, April 19, (a.k.a. the Pratt Street Riot), Baltimore, Maryland
 1861 – Camp Jackson Affair, May 10, Union forces clash with Confederate sympathizers on the streets of St. Louis, 28 dead, 100 injured., St. Louis, Missouri
 1862 – Buffalo riot of 1862, August 12, Buffalo, New York (labor riot)
 1863 – Detroit race riot of 1863, March 6
 1863 – Southern bread riots, April 2, Riots which broke out in the South during the Civil War due to food shortages throughout the Confederate States of America
 1863 – Battle of Fort Fizzle, June, also known as the Holmes County Draft Riots, active resistance to the draft during the Civil War, Holmes County, Ohio
 1863 – New York City draft riots, July 13–16, (anti-draft)
 1864 – Charleston Riot, March 28, Charleston, Illinois
 1865 – April 1-3, 1865 Burning of Richmond The endgame of the Civil War
 1866 – Memphis Riots of 1866, May 1–3, Race riot that broke out during Reconstruction, Memphis, Tennessee
 1866 – New Orleans riot, July 30, New Orleans, Louisiana
 1867 – 1867 Franklin riot, July 10, Franklin, Tennessee
 1867 – 1867 Rogersville riot, July 26, Rogersville, Tennessee
 1868 – Pulaski Riot, Pulaski, Tennessee (race riot)

1870–1879

 1870 – First New York City Orange riot, Irish Catholics versus Irish Protestants
 1870 – Kirk-Holden war, July–November, Caswell and Alamance counties North Carolina
 1870 – Mamaroneck Riot, labor riot between Italian and Irish laborers
 1870 – Eutaw Riot, Eutaw, Alabama, Ku Klux Klan attacked a Republican rally
 1871 – Second New York City Orange riot 
 1871 – Meridian race riot of 1871, March, Meridian, Mississippi
 1871 – Los Angeles anti-Chinese riot, Los Angeles, California
 1873 – Colfax massacre, April 13, Colfax, Louisiana (race related)
 1874 – Coushatta massacre, August, An attack by the White League on Republican officeholders and freedmen, Coushatta, Louisiana
 1874 – Election Riot of 1874, Barbour County, Alabama (race related)
 1874 – Tompkins Square Riot, New York City (poverty)
 1874 – Battle of Liberty Place, New Orléans, Louisiana (anti-Reconstruction)
 1876 – South Carolina civil disturbances of 1876, South Carolina (race riots)
 1877 – Widespread rioting occurred across the US as part of the Great Railroad Strike of 1877:
 Baltimore railroad strike in Baltimore, Maryland
 Chicago railroad strike of 1877, Chicago, IL
 Philadelphia Railroad Strike, Philadelphia, Pennsylvania
 Pittsburgh Railway Riots, in Pittsburgh, Pennsylvania
 Reading Railroad massacre, Reading, Pennsylvania
 Saint Louis general strike, July, East St. Louis, Illinois
 Scranton General Strike, in Scranton, Pennsylvania
 Shamokin uprising, Shamokin, Pennsylvania
 1877 – San Francisco Riot of 1877 (anti-Chinese immigration)

1880–1889
 1880 – 1880 Garret Mountain May Day riot, May 1, Paterson, New Jersey
 1882 – Greenwood, New York, insurrection of 1882
 1884 – Cincinnati riots of 1884, March 28–30, Cincinnati, Ohio
 1885 – Rock Springs massacre, September 2, 1885, white miners attack Chinese miners; 28 killed, 15 injured, Rock Springs, Wyoming
 1886 – Seattle riot of 1886, February 6–9, Seattle, Washington (anti-Chinese)
 1886 – Haymarket riot, May 4, Chicago, Illinois (labor riot)
 1886 – Bay View Massacre, May 4; 1400 workers march for eight hour work day; 7 killed and several more wounded after confrontation with National Guard. Milwaukee, Wisconsin
 1887 – Reservoir war, April 25; a minor insurrection against the State of Ohio to destroy a canal feeder reservoir and other canal infrastructure. Antwerp, Ohio
 1887 – Thibodaux Massacre, November 22–25; a racial attack mounted by white paramilitary groups in Thibodaux, Louisiana in November 1887 Thibodaux, Louisiana
 1888 – Jaybird-Woodpecker War, 1888–90, two factions of Democratic Party fight for control, Fort Bend County, Texas
 1889 – 1889 Forrest City riot, May 18, Forrest City, Arkansas (race riot)
 1889 – 1889 Jesup riot, December 25, Jesup, Georgia

1890–1899
 1891 – Hennessy Affair, New Orleans, Louisiana (anti-Italian)
 1892 – Homestead strike, July 6, 1892, Homestead, Pennsylvania
 1892–1893 – Mitcham War, Clarke County, Alabama; group of young rural farmers attack nearby businessmen, possibly motivated by 1892 election
 1894 – May Day riots of 1894, May 1, Cleveland, Ohio (labor riot)
 1894 – American Railway Union striking Pullman factory workers near Chicago, Illinois
 1894 – Pullman strike American Railway Union strike versus federal troops, many cities west of Detroit
 1894 – Bituminous Coal Miners' Strike, coal mining regions
 1895 – New Orleans dockworkers riot, New Orleans, Louisiana
 1897 – Lattimer massacre, September 1897, near Hazleton, Pennsylvania (labor massacre)
1898 – 1898 Tampa riot, June 6–7, Tampa, Florida; confrontation between white and segregated black soldiers
 1898 – Battle of Virden, October 12, Coal strike; 11 killed, 35 wounded, Virden, Illinois
 1898 – Phoenix election riot, November 8, Greenwood County, South Carolina (race riot)
 1898 – Wilmington insurrection, November 10, Wilmington, North Carolina (race riot)
 1899 – Pana riot, April 10, Coal mine labor conflict; 7 killed, 6 wounded, Pana, Illinois
 1899 – Coeur d'Alene, Idaho labor confrontation of 1899

20th century

1900–1909
 1900 – Akron Riot of 1900, Akron, Ohio
 1900 – New Orleans Riot (race riots)
 1900 – 1900 Liberty County riot, August 18, Liberty County, Georgia
 1900 – New York City Race Riot
 1901 – Denver Riots, Denver, Colorado
 1901 – Pierce City Riots, Pierce City, Missouri
 1902 – Liverpool Riots, Denver, Colorado
 1903 – Colorado Labor Wars, 1903–1904
 1903 – Anthracite Coal Strike, Eastern Pennsylvania
 1903 – Evansville Race Riot, Evansville, Indiana
 1903 – Motormen's Riot, Richmond, Virginia
 1905 – 1905 Chicago teamsters' strike, April 7 – July 19, Conflict between the Teamsters Union and the Employers' Association of Chicago by the end, 21 people killed and 416 injured, mostly workers. Chicago, IL
 1905 - New Hampshire Labor Wars, April 23, 1905-June 22, 1906, protestants attacked bosses in Rockingham and Strafford counties.
 1906 – Rioting and looting after the 1906 San Francisco earthquake 
 1906 – Atlanta Race Riot, Atlanta, Georgia
 1907 – Bellingham riots, Bellingham, Washington (anti-Indian riots)
 1908 – Springfield Race Riot, Springfield, Illinois (anti-Black riots)
 1909 – Greek Town riot, February 21, South Omaha, Nebraska (anti-Greek riots)

1910–1919
 1910 – Johnson–Jeffries riots (race riots)
 1910–1919 – Bandit War Southern Texas
 1910 – Philadelphia general strike (1910), Philadelphia, Pennsylvania
 1912 – Lawrence textile strike, Lawrence, Massachusetts (January to March)
 1912 – Grabow riot (July 7); (labor riot) 
 1913 – Wheatland Riot, August 3, Wheatland, California (labor riot)
 1913 – Paterson silk strike, February 25 – July 28 Paterson, New Jersey
 1913 – Copper Country Strike of 1913–1914, Calumet, Michigan
 1913 – Colorado Coalfield War, September 23 – April 29, 1914, Southern Colorado (labor riot)
 1913 – Indianapolis streetcar strike of 1913, October 30 – November 7, Indianapolis, Indiana
 1914 – Ludlow massacre, April 20, Ludlow, Colorado (labor massacre)
 1916 – Preparedness Day bombing, July 22, San Francisco, California
 1916 – Everett massacre, November 5, Everett, Washington (labor massacre)
 1917 – Bath riots, January 28–30, El Paso, Texas
 1917 – East St. Louis Race Riots, July 2, St. Louis, Missouri & East St. Louis, Illinois (race riots triggered by labor competition)
 1917 – Chester race riot, July 25–29, Chester, Pennsylvania
 1917 – Springfield Vigilante Riot, Springfield, Missouri
 1917 – Green Corn Rebellion, August 3, A brief popular uprising advocating for the rural poor and against military conscription, Central Oklahoma
 1917 – Houston Race riot, August 23, Houston, Texas
 1917 – St. Paul Streetcar Riots, October and December, St. Paul, Minnesota 
 1918 – Detroit trolley riot, Detroit, Michigan
 1919 – Seattle General Strike, February 6–11, Seattle, Washington
 1919 – May Day Riots, May 1, Cleveland, Ohio, Boston, Massachusetts, New York City, New York (state) (labor riots triggered by Eugene V. Debs' conviction, and American intervention in the Russian Civil War)
 1919 – Red Summer, white riots against blacks

 Blakeley, Georgia (February 8)
 Memphis, Tennessee (March 14)
 Morgan County, West Virginia (April 10)
 Jenkins County, Georgia (April 13)
 Charleston, South Carolina (May 10)
 Sylvester, Georgia (May 10)
 New London, Connecticut (May 29)
 Putnam County, Georgia (May 27–29)
 Monticello, Mississippi (May 31)
 Memphis, Tennessee (June 13)
 New London, Connecticut (June 13) 
 Annapolis, Maryland (June 27)
 Macon, Mississippi (June 27)
 Bisbee, Arizona (July 3)
 Dublin, Georgia (July 6)
 Philadelphia, Pennsylvania (July 7)
 Coatesville, Pennsylvania (July 8)
 Tuscaloosa, Alabama (July 9)
 Longview, Texas (July 10–12)
 Indianapolis, Indiana (July 14) 
 Port Arthur, Texas (July 15)
 Washington, D.C. (July 19–24)
 Norfolk, Virginia (July 21)
 New Orleans, Louisiana (July 23)
 Darby, Pennsylvania (July 23)
 Hobson City, Alabama (July 26)
 Chicago, Illinois (July 27 – August 3)
 Newberry, South Carolina (July 28)
 Bloomington, Illinois (July 31)
 Syracuse, New York (July 31)
 Philadelphia, Pennsylvania (July 31) 
 Hattiesburg, Mississippi (August 4)
 Texarkana, Texas riot of 1919 (August 6)
 New York, New York (August 21)
 Knoxville, Tennessee (August 30)
 Ellenton, South Carolina (September 15–21)
 Omaha, Nebraska (September 28–29)
 Elaine, Arkansas (October 1–2)
 Baltimore, Maryland (October 1–2)
 Corbin, Kentucky (October 31, 1919)
 Wilmington, Delaware (November 13)

 1919 – Annapolis riot of 1919, June 27, Annapolis, Maryland
 1919 – Boston Police Strike, September 9–11, Boston, Massachusetts
 1919 – Steel Strike of 1919, September 22 – January 8 Pennsylvania
1919 – Coal Strike of 1919, November 1 – December 10 Pennsylvania
 1919 – Centralia Massacre, November 11, Centralia, Washington (labor massacre)

1920–1929
 1920 – 1920 Lexington riots, Feb 20, Lexington, KY
 1920 – Battle of Matewan, May 20, Matewan, West Virginia (labor massacre)
 1920 – Ocoee massacre, November 2–3, Ocoee, Florida (race massacre on election day)
 1921 – Tulsa Race Massacre, May 31 – June 1, Tulsa, Oklahoma
 1921 – Battle of Blair Mountain, August–September, Logan County, West Virginia; labor massacre in which up to 100 people were killed
 1922 – Herrin Massacre, June 21–22, Herrin, Illinois (labor massacre)
 1922 – Straw Hat Riot, September 13–15, New York City, New York
 1922 – Perry race riot, December 14–15, Perry, Florida
 1923 – Rosewood Massacre, January 1–7, Rosewood, Florida (race massacre)
 1925 – Ossian Sweet incident, September, Detroit, Michigan
 1927 – Yakima Valley Anti-Filipino Riot, November 8–11, Yakima Valley
 1927 – Columbine Mine Massacre, November 21, Serene, Colorado
 1929 – Loray Mill strike, Gastonia, North Carolina

1930–1939
 1930 – Watsonville Riots, January 19–23, Watsonville, California (race riots)
 1931 – Battle of Evarts, May 5, Harlan County, Kentucky (labor massacre)
 1931 – The Housing Protests, August 3, Chicago, Illinois
 1931 – Hawaii Riot, Hawaii
1931–1932 Harlan County War, Harlan County, Kentucky, Part of the Coal Wars and resulted in at least 5 total deaths.
 1932 – Bonus Army March, Spring/Summer 1932, Washington, D.C.
 1932 – Ford Hunger March, March 7, 3,000 unemployed workers march on Ford Motors, five are killed, River Rouge plant, Dearborn, Michigan
 1934 – Minneapolis Teamsters Strike of 1934, Minneapolis, Minnesota
 1934 – Auto-Lite strike, April 4 – June 3, the "Battle of Toledo" riot, Toledo, Ohio
 1934 – 1934 West Coast Longshore Strike, May 9 – October 12, San Francisco Bay Area, California; Portland, Oregon; Seattle, Washington
 1934 – Textile workers strike (1934)
 1934 – Detroit World Series riot, October 10, Detroit, Michigan
 1935 – Harlem Riot, March 19–20, New York City; first "modern" race riot due to attacks turning from against people to against property
 1935 – Southern Tenant Farmers' Union Riot, Arkansas
 1935 – Terre Haute General Strike, July 22–23, A labor dispute between an enameling company and a labor union led to a two-day general strike. Indiana National Guard was called out and martial law was declared by the Governor. The city was under a state of martial law for six months. It was the third general strike in U.S. History. Terre Haute, Indiana
 1937 – Flint Sit-Down Strike, General Motors' Fisher Body Plant, Flint, Michigan
 1937 – Battle of the Overpass, May 26, Dearborn, Michigan; members of United Auto Workers (UAW) clash with Henry Ford's security guards
 1937 – Republic Steel Strike, May 30, Chicago, Illinois

1940–1949
 1942 – Sojourner Truth Homes Riot, February 28, Detroit, Michigan (race riot)
 1943 – Beaumont race riot of 1943, June, Beaumont, Texas
 1943 – Zoot Suit Riots, July 3, Los Angeles, California (anti-Hispanic and anti-zoot suit)
 1943 – Detroit race riot of 1943, June 20–21, Detroit, Michigan
 1943 – Harlem riot of 1943, August 1–3, New York City, New York (race riot)
 1946 – Columbia race riot of 1946, February 25–26, Columbia, Tennessee
 1946 – Battle of Athens (1946), August, revolt by citizens against corrupt local government, McMinn County, Tennessee
 1946 – Airport Homes race riots, Chicago, Illinois
 1947 – Fernwood Park race riot, mid-August, Fernwood, Chicago, IL
 1949 – Fairground Park riot, June 21, St. Louis Missouri (race riot)
 1949 – Anacostia Pool Riot, June 29, Anacostia, Washington, D.C. (race riot)
 1949 – Peekskill riots, Peekskill, New York (race riot)
 1949 – Englewood race riot, November 8–12, Englewood, Chicago, IL

1950–1959
 1950 – San Juan Nationalist revolt, Utuado Uprising, Jayuya Uprising, October 30, Various uprisings against United States Government rule during the Puerto Rican Nationalist Party Revolts of the 1950s in Puerto Rico
 1951 – Cicero race riot of 1951, July 12, Cicero, Illinois
 1956 – Mansfield School Integration Incident 400 pro-segregationists brandishing weapons and racist signage prevent 12 black children from entering Mansfield High School Mansfield, TX
 1958 – Battle of Hayes Pond, January 18, Maxton, North Carolina, Armed confrontation between members of the NC Lumbee tribe and the KKK.
 1959 – Harriett-Henderson Cotton Mills Strike Henderson, North Carolina

1960–1969

 1960 – HUAC riot, May 13, Students protest House Un-American Activities Committee hearings, 12 injured, 64 arrested, San Francisco, California
 1960 – Newport Jazz Festival Riot, July 2, Newport, Rhode Island
 1960 – El Cajon Boulevard Riot, August 20, San Diego, California
 1960 – Ax Handle Saturday, August 27, Jacksonville, Florida (race riot)
 1962 – Ole Miss riot 1962, September 3 – October 1, The University of Mississippi, Oxford, Mississippi (race riot caused by segregation)
 1963 – Birmingham riot of 1963, May 11, Birmingham, Alabama (race riot)
 1963 – Cambridge riot 1963, June 14, Cambridge, Maryland (race riot)
 1964 – Chester school protests, April 2–26, Chester, Pennsylvania (racially motivated)
 1964 – 1964 Monson Motor Lodge protests June thru August, St. Augustine, Florida (protests over segregation)
 1964 – The July 16 killing of James Powell by police in the Yorkville neighborhood just south of East Harlem precipitates a string of race riots in July and August, including:
 1964 – Harlem Riot of 1964, July 16–22, New York City
 1964 – Rochester 1964 race riot, July 24–25, Rochester, New York
 1964 – Jersey City Riot, August 3–5, A disorderly conduct arrest set off accusations of police brutality and were followed by protests and riots. At least two residents were shot and several police and rioters were injured, Jersey City, NJ
 1964 – Dixmoor race riot, August 15–17, Dixmoor, Illinois
 1964 – Philadelphia 1964 race riot, August 28–30, Philadelphia
 1965 – Selma to Montgomery marches, March 7–25, Alabama
 1965 – Watts riots, August 11–17, Los Angeles, California (part of the ghetto riots)
 1966 – Division Street riots, June 12–14, Humboldt Park, Chicago, Illinois (Puerto Rican riots)
 1966 – Omaha riot of 1966, July 2, Omaha, Nebraska (race riots)
 1966 – 1966 Chicago West-Side riots, July 12–15, Chicago, Illinois
1966 – 1966 New York City riots, July 14–20, New York City, New York, A riot broke out following a dispute between white and black youths. One person was killed and 53 injured. There were three arson incidents and 82 arrests. 
 1966 – Hough riots, July 18–24, Cleveland, Ohio
 1966 – Compton's Cafeteria Riot, August, San Francisco, California
1966 – Perth Amboy riots, August 2–5, Perth Amboy, New Jersey, a riot broke out following the arrest of a Hispanic man for loitering. Hispanic residents also disliked being treated negatively by the police and being ignored by the community. 26 injuries were reported (15 from law enforcement officers and 11 from civilians) and 43 arrests were made. Interference with firefighters occurred.
 1966 – Marquette Park housing march, August 5, Chicago, Illinois
 1966 – Waukegan riot, August 27, Waukegan, Illinois
 1966 – Benton Harbor riots, August 30 – September 4, Benton Harbor, Michigan
 1966 – 1966 Dayton race riot, September 1, Dayton, Ohio
 1966 – Summerhill and Vine City Riots, September 6–8 Atlanta, Georgia
 1966 – Hunters Point social uprising, September 27 – October 1 San Francisco, California
 1966 – 1966 Clearwater riot, October 31, Clearwater, Florida
1966 – Sunset Strip curfew riots, November 12, various other flareups, basis for the song "For What It's Worth (Buffalo Springfield song)", West Hollywood, California
 1967 – Long Hot Summer of 1967 refers to a year in which 159 race riots, almost all African-American, erupted across the United States, including:
 1967 – 1967 Louisville riots, April 11–mid-June, Louisville, Kentucky
 1967 – 1967 Massillion riot, April 17, Massillon, Ohio, 17 arrests were made as black and white teenagers fought each other.
 1967 – 1967 Jackson riot, May 12, Jackson, Mississippi
 1967 – 1967 Texas Southern University riot, May 16, Houston, Texas
 1967 – 1967 Boston riot, June 2–5, Boston, Massachusetts
 1967 – 1967 Clearwater riot, June 3 or 4, Clearwater, Florida, a riot started after a white police officer tried to assist an African-American officer break up a fight between two African-American men.
1967 – 1967 Philadelphia riot, June 11, Philadelphia, Pennsylvania, began after a dispute involving a rug. Bottle and brick throwing were reported in an African-American neighborhood and 4 police officers were injured.
1967 – 1967 Prattville riot, June 11, Prattville, Alabama, riots following the arrest of Stokely Carmichael arrest. 4 people were wounded and 10 arrested.
 1967 – Tampa riot of 1967, June 11–14, Tampa, Florida
 1967 – Avondale riots, June 12–15, Cincinnati, Ohio
1967 – 1967 Maywood riots, June 14, Maywood, Illinois, riots began after young African-American men and women demanded a swimming pool in the historically neglected neighborhood.
 1967 – 1967 Atlanta riots, June 17–20, Atlanta, Georgia
 1967 – Buffalo riot of 1967, June 27, Buffalo, New York
1967 – 1967 Waterloo riots, July 8–9, Waterloo, Iowa, riots started after a young African-American man was arrested for assault and battery of an elderly white man sweeping the sidewalk in front of his business.
 1967 – 1967 Kansas City riot, July 9, Kansas City, Missouri, 1 person was injured and 11 arrested.
 1967 – 1967 Newark riots, July 12–17, Newark, New Jersey
 1967 – 1967 Hartford riot, July 14, Hartford, Connecticut
 1967 – 1967 Plainfield riots, July 14–21, Plainfield, New Jersey
 1967 – 1967 Fresno riot, July 15–17, Fresno, California, riots were sparked after the loss of a local youth job program used extensively by African-American and Latino youths. 2 people were injured, 27 arrested and 46 cases of arson were reported.
1967 – Cairo riot, July 17, Cairo, Illinois
1967 – 1967 New Brunswick riots, July 17–18, New Brunswick, New Jersey, riots began after a group of roughly 200 African-American teenagers protested against unfair treatment in local public schools, unemployment, the closing of a social club and long-term police brutality. Protesters looted stores in the city's business district, specifically targeting those considered to treat black customers unfairly. By 2 AM 32 adults and 18 juveniles, all of them black, had been arrested for looting, possession of stolen property, carrying weapons, and loitering. In response, Mayor Patricia Sheehan declared a 10 PM curfew. On June 18, a crowd of 200 people gathered where 75 heavily armed police officers were barricading a route to the downtown business district. The protesters promised to disperse once the police were removed, and they did.
1967 – 1967 Minneapolis riot, July 19–24, Minneapolis, Minnesota
1967 – 1967 Wadesboro riot, July 22, Wadesboro, North Carolina, after a black person was shot and run over by a car, local black residents went on a rock throwing spree.
1967 – 1967 New York City riot, July 22–25, East Harlem & South Bronx, New York City, a riot began in East Harlem after a policeman killed a Puerto Rican he claimed was holding a knife and threatening him. The riot later spread to the South Bronx.
 1967 – 1967 Birmingham riot, July 23, Birmingham, Alabama, 11 people were injured and over 70 arrested with the National Guard being called in to assist the police.
 1967 – 1967 Toledo Riot, July 23, Toledo, Ohio
 1967 – 1967 Rochester riots, July 23–24, Rochester, New York a riot began following police shutting down a drag race. 1 person was killed, 9 injured, 146 arson cases reported and 69 people arrested. The New York State Police and the National Guard would be called up.
1967 – 1967 Lima riots, July 23–26, Lima, Ohio riots began following the killing of a white man by a black man. Two cases of arson were reported and 23 arrests made.
 1967 – 1967 Detroit riot, July 23–29, Detroit, Michigan
 1967 – Cambridge riot of 1967, July 24, a.k.a. the H. Rap Brown riot, Cambridge, Maryland
 1967 – 1967 Waukegan riots, July 24–25, Waukegan, Illinois
1967 – 1967 Grand Rapids riot, July 25–27, Grand Rapids, Michigan, a riot began following the Grand Rapids Police raiding and shutting down an illegal bar. As the patrons stood on the street police attempted to arrest a young man for stealing a car. The young man had a broken arm in a cast and the onlookers accused the police of brutality in the arrest. The next night rioters began using Molotov cocktails to burn down businesses and houses. White vigilantes took to the streets to counter the protesters. Gov. George Romney ordered the National Guard to intervene. By the end of the protests there were 44 injuries, no deaths and 30 arrests. 
 1967 – 1967 Saginaw riot, July 26, Saginaw, Michigan
1967 – 1967 Albany riot, Albany, New York, July 27–28, riots began in response to a rumor of two deaths at the hands of the police. 41 people were arrested and there were 3 arson cases.
1967 – 1967 Wilmington riots, July 28–30, Wilmington, Delaware, 13 were injured, 14 arson cases and 325 arrests were reported during the riots.
 1967 – 1967 Rockford riots, July 29–30, Rockford, Illinois, 11 people injured and 44 arrested.
 1967 – Albina Riot of 1967, July 30, Portland, Oregon
 1967 – Milwaukee riot, July 30, Milwaukee, Wisconsin
 1967 – 1967 Riviera Beach riot, July 30–31, Riviera Beach & West Palm Beach, Florida
 1967 – 1967 Providence riots, July 31 – August 1, 23 people were injured and 14 arrests were made.
1967 – 1967 New Haven riots, August 19–23, a riot began following a white restaurant owner shooting at a Puerto Rican man who had come at him with a knife. Over 200 Connecticut State Troopers would be called in to assist the city's police department that had 430 officers. 3 people were injured, 679 arrested and 90 cases of arson reported.
 1967 - 1967 Century City demonstration, anti-war protesters in Los Angeles are beaten by police.
 1968 – Orangeburg Massacre, S.C. State Univ., February 8, Orangeburg, South Carolina
 1968 – Memphis sanitation strike riot, March 28, Memphis, Tennessee
 1968 – Assassination of Martin Luther King, Jr., April 4, Memphis, Tennessee, precipitates all April 4–14 riots, including: 
 1968 – 1968 Detroit riot, April 4–5, Detroit, Michigan 
 1968 – 1968 New York City riots, April 4–5, New York City, New York
 1968 – 1968 Tallahassee riots, April 4–7, Tallahassee, Florida, One person killed and five injured.
 1968 – 1968 Washington, D.C. riots, April 4–8, Washington, D.C.
1968 – 1968 Boston riots, April 4–9, Boston, Massachusetts, 34 injuries were reported, 16 cases of arson and 87 arrests.
1968 – 1968 Charlotte riots, April 4–12, Charlotte, North Carolina, seven injuries were reported; 29 cases of arson and 30 arrests.
 1968 – 1968 Chicago riots, West Side Riots, April 5–7, Chicago, Illinois
 1968 – 1968 Norfolk riots, April 5–10, Norfolk, Virginia
 1968 – 1968 Pittsburgh riots, April 5–11, Pittsburgh, Pennsylvania
 1968 – 1968 Jacksonville riots, April 6–11, Jacksonville, Florida one person killed and 15 injured, with 12 of those caused by police.
 1968 – Baltimore riot of 1968, April 6–14, Baltimore, Maryland
 1968 – Avondale riot of 1968, April 8, Cincinnati, Ohio
 1968 – 1968 Kansas City riot, April 9, Kansas City, Missouri
 1968 – Wilmington Riot of 1968, April 9–10, Wilmington, Delaware
 1968 – Trenton Riot of 1968, April 9–11, Trenton, New Jersey
 1968 – Columbia University protests of 1968, April 23, New York City, New York
 1968 – Louisville riots of 1968, May 27, Louisville, Kentucky
 1968 – 1968 Paterson riots, July 2–7, Paterson, New Jersey riots began following rumors a man was killed by the police while being arrested. 150 people were arrested and 86 cases of arson reported.
1968 – 1968 Coney Islands Riots, July 19–22, Coney Island, New York City, New York, the cause of the riots are unclear. Five police officers were injured and eight people were arrested by the police in a neighborhood that was predominantly black and Puerto Rican.
 1968 – Akron riot, July 17–23, Akron, Ohio
 1968 – Glenville Shootout, July 23–28, Cleveland, Ohio
 1968 – 1968 Richmond riots. July 25–30, Richmond, California riots broke out after a 15-year-old black male suspect in a car robbery was shot by police. 17 arson cases were reported and 564 people arrested.
 1968 – 1968 Miami riot, August 7–8, Miami, Florida
 1968 – 1968 Democratic National Convention protests, including the police riots of August 27–28, Chicago, Illinois
 1969 – Zip to Zap riot, May 9–11, Zap, North Dakota
 1969 – People's Park Riots, May, Berkeley, California
 1969 – 1969 Greensboro uprising, May 21–25, Greensboro, North Carolina
 1969 – Cairo disorders, May–December, Cairo, Illinois
 1969 – Stonewall riots, June 28 – July 2, New York City, New York
 1969 – 1969 York Race Riot, July 17–24, York, Pennsylvania
 1969 – Days of Rage, October 8–11, Weathermen riot in Chicago, Illinois

1970–1979
 1970 – San Francisco Police Department Park Station bombing, February 16, San Francisco, CA
 1970 – University of Puerto Rico riot, March 4–11, at least one killed, Río Piedras, Puerto Rico
1970 – Coachella Riots, April 5, Coachella, California, started after a Brown Beret member disrupted a dance by getting on the stage and calling for "action." Three people were arrested, four police officers injured and the mayor's house was burned down.
 1970 – Student strike of 1970, May 1970
 1970 – Kent State riots/shootings, May 4, 1970, four killed, Kent, Ohio
 1970 – New Haven Green Disorders, Yale University, May 1970, New Haven, Connecticut
 1970 – Augusta Riot, May 11–13, Augusta, Georgia
 1970 – Hard Hat Riot, Wall Street, May 8, New York City
 1970 – Jackson State killings, May 14–15, two killed, Jackson, Mississippi
 1970 – Stoneman Meadow Riot, July 4, 1970, Yosemite, California
 1970 – 1970 Asbury Park race riots, July 4–10, Asbury Park, New Jersey
 1970 – 1970 Memorial Park riot, August 24–27, Royal Oak, Michigan
 1970 – Sterling Hall bombing, Univ. of Wisc., August 24, one killed, Madison, Wisconsin
 1970 – Chicano Moratorium riot, August 29, Los Angeles, California
 1971 – Wilmington riot 1971, February 9, Wilmington, North Carolina
 1971 – May Day protests 1971, May 3, Washington, D.C.
 1971 – Albuquerque riots, June 13–15, Albuquerque, New Mexico the arrest of several Chicano teens for underage drinking at Albuquerque's Roosevelt Park set off 30 hours of violence. Police fired their guns in the air and tossed tear gas but the angry crowd overturned police cars, started fires and smashed windows, forcing officers to flee. Some 600 people were arrested, dozens injured and the area and nearby buildings damaged.
1971 – Colonia riots, July 18–19, Colonia, California 38 people arrested.
 1971 – Camden riots, August 1971, Camden, New Jersey
 1971 – Santa Fe Fiestas riot, September 7, 1971, Santa Fe, New Mexico, civil disturbances and vandalism during annual Fiestas event. Police fired tear gas into crowd. 100 National Guardsman were called to protect buildings and keep order. 23 people were arrested.
 1971 – Attica Prison uprising, September 9–13, at least 39 killed, Attica, New York
1972 – Pharr riots, February 6, Pharr, Texas started after police attacked a crowd protesting police brutality and killed one person.
1972 – April 1972 Santa Paula riots, April 23, Santa Paula, California 35-40 arrests.
1972 – Gainesville riots, May 12, 1972, Gainesville, Florida, anti-war protesters and police clashed for several hours. 174 people were arrested and 24 injured.
1972 – 1972 Boston riots, July 1972, Boston, Massachusetts
 1973 – Wounded Knee incident, February 27 – May 8, Wounded Knee, South Dakota
 1973 – Shooting of Clifford Glover Riot, April 23, Rioting broke out in South Jamaica, Queens after an undercover police officer shot and killed a 10-year-old African-American youth. New York, New York
 1974 – SLA Shootout, May 17, Los Angeles, California
 1974 – Baltimore police strike, July, Baltimore, Maryland
 1974 – Boston desegregation busing riots: at least 40 riots throughout Boston, Massachusetts from September 1974 through September 1976.
 1975 – Livernois–Fenkell riot, July 1975, Detroit, Michigan
 1976 – Escambia High School riots, February 5, Pensacola, Florida
 1976 – Marquette Park unrest, June–August, Chicago, Illinois
 1977 – Humboldt Park riot, June 5–6, Chicago, Illinois
 1977 – New York City Blackout riot 1977, July 13–14, New York City, New York
 1978 – Fireman Strike Arson, July 2, 1978, Memphis, TN
 1978 – Moody Park riot, May 5, 1978, Houston, Texas
 1979 – Herman Hill riot, April 15, Wichita, Kansas 
 1979 – White Night riots, May 1979, San Francisco, California
 1979 – Levittown Gas Riot, June 23–24, Thousands rioted in response to increased gasoline prices in the U.S., 198 arrested, 44 police and 200 rioters injured. Gas stations were damaged and cars set on fire, Levittown, Pennsylvania
 1979 – Greensboro massacre, November 3, Shootout between members of the Communist Workers Party and members of the Ku Klux Klan and the American Nazi Party. Greensboro, North Carolina.

1980–1989
 1980 – New Mexico State Penitentiary riot, February 2–3, Santa Fe, New Mexico
 1980 – Miami riot 1980, May 17–19, Miami, Florida
 1982 – 1982 Overtown riot, December 28, Miami, Florida
 1984 – Tower Hill riot, Lawrence, Massachusetts
 1985 – 1985 MOVE bombing, May 13, Philadelphia, Pennsylvania
 1986 – Marquette Park KKK rally, June 28, Chicago, Illinois
1987 – 1987 Tampa riots, Tampa, Florida
 1988 – Tompkins Square Park riot, August 6–7, New York City
 1988 – Cedar Grove, Shreveport, Louisiana
 1989 – 1989 Miami riot, January 16–18, four days of rioting in the Overtown neighborhood began after a police officer shot a man driving a motorcycle who was fleeing another officer. He crashed and his passenger was also killed. Miami, Florida
 1989 – 1989 Tampa riot, February 1, Tampa, Florida a riot began following the death of an African American man while in police custody.
The disturbance lasted for an hour with 150 youths participating. A grocery store was looted and set on fire. Four police officers, including one involved in the initial arrest, were injured.

1990–1999
 1990 – 1990 Wynwood riots, December 3, 1990, Miami, Florida, Started after the acquittal of police officers who had beaten a drug dealer named Leonardo Mercado to death in December 1988.
 1991 – 1991 Washington, DC riot, Mount Pleasant riot, May 5–9, Washington, D.C.
 1991 – Overtown, Miami, June 28, Riot in the heavily Black section of Overtown against Cuban Americans. Miami, Florida
 1991 – Crown Heights riot, August 1991, Brooklyn, New York
 1992 – L.A. Rodney King riots, April–May 1992, Los Angeles, California
 1992 – West Las Vegas riots, April 29, Las Vegas, Nevada
 1992 – 1992 Washington Heights riots, July 4–7, Manhattan, New York, Dominican community
 1996 – St. Petersburg, Florida Riot 1996, October 1996, St. Petersburg, Florida
 1997 – North Hollywood shootout, February 1997, Los Angeles, California
 1999 – Michigan State University student riot, April 1999, East Lansing, Michigan
 1999 – Woodstock '99 music festival incident, July 1999, Rome, New York
 1999 – WTO Meeting of 1999, "The Battle of Seattle", November 1999, Seattle, Washington

21st century

2000–2009
 2000 – Elián González affair, Miami, Florida
 2000 - Firing of Bob Knight, September 11, 2,000-10,000 Indiana Hoosiers Men's Basketball fans participate in vandalism and protests, Bloomington, Indiana
 2000 – Puerto Rican Day Parade attacks, June 11, Central Park, New York City
 2000 – Brooks Brothers riot, November 22, Miami-Dade County, Florida
 2001 – Seattle Mardi Gras riot, February 27, Seattle, Washington
 2001 – 2001 Cincinnati Riots, April 10–12, Cincinnati, Ohio
 2003 – Benton Harbor riot, June 2003, Benton Harbor, Michigan
 2003 – Miami FTAA Protests, November 2003, Miami, Florida
 2005 – Civil disturbances and military action in New Orleans after Hurricane Katrina, August – September, New Orleans, Louisiana
 2005 – 2005 Toledo riot, October 15, Toledo, Ohio
 2006 – San Bernardino punk riot, March 4, San Bernardino, California
 2007 – The Los Angeles May Day mêlée, May 1, Los Angeles, California
 2009 – Riots against BART Police shooting of Oscar Grant, January 7, 120 arrested, Oakland, California
 2009 – Akron riots, March 14, 2009, 7 arrested; and July 2009, unknown number arrested, Akron, Ohio
 2009 – 2009 G20 Pittsburgh summit protests, September 24–25, 193 arrested

2010–2019
 2010 – Springfest riot, April 10
 2010 – Santa Cruz May Day riot, May 1
 2010 – Oakland protest riot, November 5, protesting sentence of former BART officer in shooting of Oscar Grant on New Years Day 2009; see BART Police shooting of Oscar Grant. Oakland, California
 2011 – Madison Occupation. Protestors storm and occupy the Wisconsin state capitol building for 18 days. 
 2011 – Occupy Wall Street (Brooklyn Bridge protests).
 2011 – Occupy Oakland Oakland protests riots. October.
 2012 – Kentucky Wildcats supporters in Lexington, Kentucky
 2012 – NATO 2012 Chicago Summit, May.
 2012 – Anaheim police shooting and protests, July 28.
 2013 – Flatbush Riots, March 11, Riots in Brooklyn, New York after the death of Kimani Gray who was shot and killed by NYPD.
 2014 – Bundy Standoff, April 5–May,
 2014 – Ferguson unrest, Ferguson and St. Louis, Missouri, August 10 and November 24. Following the shooting death of Michael Brown by a Ferguson police officer
 2014 – St. Louis, Missouri – October 8,
 2014 – New York, New York, and Berkeley, California.
 2014 – 2014 Oakland riots, November–December, 
 2014 – Berkeley, Missouri, December 23–24. Antonio Martin is shot to death by police in a St. Louis suburb nearby to Ferguson
 2015 – 2015 Baltimore protests, April 25–28 following the death of Freddie Gray while in police custody.
 2015 – St. Louis, Missouri, August 19. Conflict with police following fatal shooting by St. Louis police officers of a black teenager Mansur Ball-Bey
 2016 – Occupation of the Malheur National Wildlife Refuge, January–February, One killed and several dozen arrested at Malheur National Wildlife Refuge, Oregon.
 2016 – Donald Trump Chicago rally protest, March 11.
 2016 – Democracy Spring rally in April. March to Washington D.C. and sit-ins lead to arrests.
 2016 – 2016 Sacramento riot, June 26, A confrontation between white nationalists and left-wing counter protesters at the California State Capitol. 
 2016 – Widespread protests erupt in response to two deaths at the hands of police, the Shooting of Alton Sterling and shooting of Philando Castile. New York City, Chicago, St. Paul, Baton Rouge, and other cities.
 2016 – Milwaukee riots, Sherman Park, August 13–15. Milwaukee, Wisconsin, sparked by the fatal police shooting of 23-year-old Sylville Smith.
 2016 – Charlotte riot, September 20–21, Protests and riots break out in response to the shooting of Keith Lamont Scott by a Charlotte police officer.
 2016 – Dakota Access Pipeline protests, 411 protesters arrested. 
 2016 – Anti-Trump protests, November 9–2
 2017 – Berkeley, California, February 1, civil unrest ensued at UC Berkeley 
 2017 – Anaheim, California protests, February 21, protesters demonstrated after a police officer grabbed a 13-year-old boy and fired a single shot.
 2017 – May Day, in Olympia, Washington and Portland, Oregon, protestors demonstrated for workers rights.
 2017 – Unite the Right rally, Charlottesville, Virginia, August 11–12, opposition to the removal of a statue of Confederate general Robert E. Lee
 2017 – St. Louis protests, September 15–November 24
 2019 – Memphis riot, June 13, following the fatal shooting of Brandon Webber by U.S. Marshals, Memphis, TN.

2020–2023

 2020 – New York City FTP protests, January 31, Anti-Transit Police and MTA protest resulting in hundreds of arrests over the three separate days of demonstration. Vandalism and violence on train stations were reported.
2020 – University of Dayton closure riot, March 11, A riot broke out following the university's announcement of a temporary closure due to COVID-19.
 2020 – George Floyd protests, May 26 – Following the murder of George Floyd, protests and civil unrest against police brutality and systemic racism began in Minneapolis and quickly spread across the United States and the world, on a scale unseen since the unrest of the summers of 1967 and 1968. Derek Chauvin, the policeman who held his knee on Floyd's neck for over nine minutes, was soon fired along with the three other officers involved. Later, Chauvin was arrested and charged with second-degree unintentional murder, third-degree murder, and second-degree manslaughter; after being taken into custody and released on bail in October 2020, Chauvin was found guilty on all charges in April 2021 and sentenced to 22 years and 6 months in prison in June 2021. The other three policemen were convicted of federal civil rights violations in February of 2022. Widespread protests and riots spread to other American cities and then to other countries, with Floyd's murder garnering condemnation. Protest tactics included peaceful occupation and resistance, but was overshadowed by widespread looting and damage of private and public properties. In the Seattle neighborhood of Capitol Hill, an occupation protest and self-declared autonomous zone was established on June 8, 2020, covering six city blocks and a park after the Seattle Police Department left their East Precinct building. The area was cleared of occupants by police on July 1, 2020. May 29 began national days of protests in every state; some of which lasted throughout the summer of 2020.
 2020 – Kenosha unrest, August 23–28, On August 23 in Kenosha, Wisconsin, Jacob Blake was shot in the back by a police officer while not complying with their attempt to arrest him. Protests and rioting occurred after the incident. A State of Emergency was declared, and police used tear gas and rubber bullets to disperse the crowd. During several days of rioting, government buildings were damaged, businesses were looted and set on fire, and vehicles were firebombed, including 100 cars burned at a car dealership. On the third day of unrest an armed teenager shot three rioters, whom one was also armed, wounding one and killing two. By August 28, almost 1000 Wisconsin National Guard troops were on the streets, backed by National Guard troops from Michigan, Alabama and Arizona. Nearly 100 buildings were damaged with the cost of damage to City property close to $2 million and the cost to private property damaged near $50 million.
 2020 – Minneapolis false rumors riot, August 26–28, On August 26, a false rumor that police shot a man in Minneapolis started riots that set four buildings on fire and damaged 72 others.
 2020 – Jewish Protest, October 7–8, In Brooklyn, New York, members of the Orthodox Jewish community protested over new COVID-19 restrictions. Minor fires were set, masks were burned, and journalist Jacob Kornbluh was attacked. Heshy Tischler was taken into custody for inciting a riot.
 2020 – Philadelphia riot, October 26 – November 4, Caused by the Killing of Walter Wallace by Philadelphia police.
 2020 – 2020–21 United States election protests, November 3 – March 2021, Several demonstrations were held during and after the 2020 presidential election. Clashes between pro-Trump supporters and counterprotesters occurred on multiple nights, including November 14 and December 12. On the night of December 12, there were multiple stabbings and over 23 people were arrested.
 2021 – United States Capitol attack, January 6, After months of unsuccessful attempts by President Donald Trump and his allies to overturn the results of the 2020 presidential election, asserting voter fraud occurred and unsuccessfully attempting to pressure state election officials to alter the election results in his favor, a large group of pro-Trump supporters, allegedly called to action by Trump, entered the United States Capitol in an attempt to prevent the certification of Joe Biden's election victory. The Capitol was vandalized, including doors, windows, and offices, forcing members of Congress and Vice President Mike Pence to evacuate. One death occurred as a direct result of the unrest, and several additional deaths were reported subsequently, but determined to be due to unrelated or natural causes. Ashli Babbitt, an Air Force veteran from Southern California, was shot and killed by a Capitol Police officer as she attempted to enter through a broken window leading to the Speaker's Lobby inside the Capitol. During a rush of protestors attempting to fight their way through the police line, Rosanne Boyland was unintentionally crushed and killed. While originally believed to have been a victim of blunt force trauma or chemical spray during altercations between protestors and police, officer Brian Sicknick also died shortly after the violence from a stroke. Nearly 140 police officers were injured. In the aftermath of the unrest, which received widespread domestic and international condemnation, the Chief of the Capitol Police resigned under pressure and President Trump was impeached a second time under accusation of incitement of insurrection. His subsequent trial in February 2021 ultimately resulted in an acquittal by the Senate, making Trump the first to be tried as a former president and to be impeached and acquitted twice.
 2021 – Daunte Wright protests, April 11 – February 18, 2022, On April 11, police officer Kim Potter fatally shot 20-year-old African-American man Daunte Wright during a traffic stop in Brooklyn Center, Minnesota, near where former police officer Derek Chauvin was standing trial for the murder of George Floyd. Protests demanding justice for Wright were met with force by law enforcement, who used tear gas, canisters, and other methods to disperse protesters. Several demonstrations escalated into riots with property damage, looting, and violent clashes between protesters and police. On April 14, shortly after she resigned from the police force, Potter was arrested and charged with second-degree manslaughter. In response to the unrest, Minneapolis Mayor Jacob Frey declared a State of Emergency and imposed a citywide curfew amid mass arrests.
 2021 – May 9 – June 2021, amid the 2021 Israel–Palestine crisis, the United States saw a rise in antisemitism and violence against Jews, as both pro-Israel and pro-Palestine protesters took to the streets of major U.S. cities. On May 20, in Midtown Manhattan, pro-Israel and pro-Palestine protesters both took to the streets; the two groups collided and fights broke out. At least 26 people were arrested during the protests on various charges, including obstructing governmental administration, resisting arrest, unlawful assembly, disorderly conduct, and criminal possession of a weapon, according to police. During the violence, anti-semitic attackers beat a Jewish man. Also on May 20 in Bal Harbour, Florida, an SUV carrying four supporters of Palestine drove by a synagogue and threw garbage at a Jewish family. A nearby driver, armed with a gun, witnessed the incident and jumped to the family's defense, chasing the men away. In a separate incident, a man in Miami drove a van painted with Nazi symbols past a pro-Israel demonstration and shouted antisemitic slurs; the man was subsequently arrested and later released.
2021 – Winston Boogie Smith riots, June 3–7, On June 3, at about 2:10 P.M at a parking garage on Lake Street between Fremont and Hennepin Avenues in the Upton district of Minneapolis, a 32-year-old African-American man named Winston Boogie Smith was killed by Hennepin County and Ramsey County Sheriff's Departments deputies who were assisting the US Marshals Service in arresting him. The US Marshals Service stated their reason for arresting him was because he had failed to appear in court on May 19 after being arrested for firearms possession. There is no known video footage of the incident occurring. Both a Ramsey and a Hennepin county deputy were later placed on administrative leave. A crowd gathered after the incident occurred waiting to hear more information pertaining to the incident. During that night a handful of businesses were looted and vandalized. 9 arrests were reported to have been made. On June 13, an SUV drove into a parked car that was shielding protesters and the car was pushed into a crowd, leading to the death of one person and injuring 3 others. On July 8, 2021, a video link was posted on Twitter showing a driver in the Uptown area of Minneapolis "Firing a gun into the air while doing burnouts".
2021-2023 – Stop Cop City, Due to an increase of crime and a lack of police morale from the 2020–2022 United States racial unrest in the city of Atlanta, a training facility was proposed to be built in order to address these issues. In response, forest defenders known as Stop Cop City began to protest the construction by barricading the area and performing sit-ins in the forest. On January 18, 2023, law enforcement agencies attempted to clear the area. During the raid, a trooper was shot in the leg and a protester, identified as Manuel Terán, known also as "Tortuguita", was killed by police. Police stated Terán fired on them without warning. Journalists who had previously interviewed Terán, other protestors, and Terán's family have questioned whether Terán fired first, pointing to lack of body-camera footage of the shooting and calling for an independent investigation. In response to the shooting, on January 21, 2023, protesters marched through Atlanta; some burned an Atlanta Police Department vehicle and started attacking businesses that have financial contributed to the Atlanta Police Foundation.

See also
 List of conflicts in North America
 
 List of incidents of civil unrest in Colonial North America
 List of massacres in the United States
 List of protest marches on Washington, DC
 List of race riots – see U.S. section.
 List of rebellions in the United States
 List of riots (notable incidents of civil disorder worldwide)
 List of violent spectator incidents in sports
 Lists of incidents of unrest and violence in the United States by city
 List of incidents of political violence in Washington, D.C.
 Mass racial violence in the United States
 Murder of workers in labor disputes in the United States
 Insurrection Act of 1807

References

Further reading
 Gottesman, Ronald, and Richard Maxwell Brown, eds. Violence in America: an encyclopedia (1999).
 Graham, Hugh Davis, and Ted Robert Gurr, eds. Violence in America: Historical and comparative perspectives (1969).
 Gurr, Ted Robert, ed. Violence in America: Protest, rebellion, reform (1979).
 Hofstadter, Richard, and Michael Wallace, eds. American violence: A documentary history (1971).
 Victor, Orville J. History Of American Conspiracies: A Record Of Treason, Insurrection, Rebellion, &c. In The United States Of America. From 1760 To 1860 (1863) online

Incidents of civil unrest
United States
 
Civil unrest